Un novio para Laura is a 1955 Argentine film, directed by Julio Saraceni and starring Lolita Torres and Alberto Berco. Filming took place in Buenos Aires.

Cast
 Lolita Torres as Laura Mendez Peñalba
 Alberto Berco........Damian Dinardo
 Francisco Álvarez...uncle Gregorio
 Isabel Pradas as Florinda, Laura's mother
 Julián Bourges as Felipe Arrillaga
 José Comellas as Ramiro, Laura' father
 Diana Myriam Jones as Liliana, Laura's little sister
 Liria Marín as Patricia, Laura's younger sister 
 Rolando Dumas as Anibal, Patricia's boyfriend
 Adelaida Soler as Manon Fuentes
 Carlos Cotto as Damian's father
 Rafael Diserio as Gervasio, Damian's false father
 Warly Ceriani as Dante Mendoza
 Mara Valpi
 Celia Geraldy as Damian' false mother
 Esperanza Otero as Damian's mother
 Roberto Bordoni as Lombardo
 Alberto Rella
 Osvaldo Cabrera
 Silvio Soldán

References

External links
 

1955 films
1950s Spanish-language films
Argentine black-and-white films
1950s Argentine films